Kuta is a district and village in the Indonesian province of Bali.

Kuta may also refer to:

Places
Bosnia and Herzegovina
Kuta, Foča
Kuta, Kalinovik

Indonesia
Kuta (Lombok), a village in the province of West Nusa Tenggara
Kuta District, in Bali
Kuta North, a district in Bali

Montenegro
 Kuta, Nikšić

Russia
Kuta (river), a tributary of the Lena in Siberia

Other uses
 Kuta (caste), a Hindu caste in India
 Kuta (clothing), a type of headgear
 Kuta (surname) (includes a list of persons with the surname)
 Tunica Municipal Airport, Mississippi, United States
 KUTA-LD, a low-power television station (channel 13, virtual 30) licensed to serve Ogden, Utah, United States
 K08QL-D, a low-power television station (channel 8) licensed to serve Logan, Utah, which held the call sign KUTA-LP from 2005 to 2009, and KUTA-LD from 2009 to 2020
 KUTA, an AM radio station in Salt Lake City, Utah (1938-1956)

See also 
 Kota (disambiguation)
 Kouta (disambiguation)
 Kutas
 Kutha
 South Kuta